The 2001 Milan–San Remo was the 92nd edition of the monument classic Milan–San Remo and was won by Erik Zabel of .

Results

References

2001
March 2001 sports events in Europe
2001 in road cycling
2001 in Italian sport
Milan-San Remo